The Provisions of Oxford were constitutional reforms developed during the Oxford Parliament of 1258 to resolve a dispute between King Henry III of England and his barons. The reforms were designed to ensure the king adhered to the rule of law and governed according to the advice of his barons. A council of fifteen barons was chosen to advise and control the king and supervise his ministers. Parliament was to meet regularly three times a year. 

Like the earlier Magna Carta, the Provisions of Oxford demonstrated the ability of the barons to press their concerns in opposition to the monarchy. The king ultimately refused to abide by the reforms, sparking the Second Barons' War. The king defeated his opponents, and royal authority was restored.

Background

When in the spring of 1258 Henry III sought financial aid from Parliament, he was confronted by a group of barons who insisted on a new commission of reform, in the shape of a committee of twenty-four members, twelve selected by the Crown, twelve by the barons. The king's nominees to the committee were:

 Boniface Archbishop of Canterbury
 Fulk Basset, Bishop of London
 Aymer of Valence, Bishop elect of Winchester and the king's half-brother
 the abbot of Westminster
 Henry of Almain, the king's nephew 
 John de Warenne, 6th Earl of Surrey
 John du Plessis, 7th Earl of Warwick
 William of Valence, the king's half-brother
 Guy of Lusignan, the king's half-brother
 three clerks of the royal household.

Five of the king's men were foreigners. Among the twelve chosen by the magnates, only one was a foreigner—Simon de Montfort, 6th Earl of Leicester. The only clergymen chosen by the magnates was Waltere Cantilupe, Bishop of Worcester. The Twenty-four presented their reform programme at the Oxford Parliament held in June 1258.

Reforms
The provisions fit into three categories: (1) appointment and control of principal ministers, (2) the king's council, and (3) parliament. 

Concerning ministers, the office of justiciar was revived. In the past, the justiciar had been the king's chief minister and viceroy whenever he was in Normandy. After the loss of the Angevin Empire during the reign of King John, however, the office had fallen into disuse. The new justiciar would be an ex officio member of the king's council and have authority over the judiciary, including the right to hear appeals from all other courts, whether royal or baronial. He was to hold office for one year and was responsible to the king's council for his conduct. According to historian George Sayles, "[t]his was a most serious departure from previous practice, for it placed at the head of the judiciary a minister virtually independent of the king." Hugh Bigod, who was acceptable to both the king and the barons, was made justiciar.  

The chancellor and treasurer were also limited to one year in office, and like the justiciar were not to take direct orders from the king. Control of royal finance was given to the exchequer, so the king was unable to divert revenues for his own spending. Local offices, such as sheriff and escheator, were also to be under annual term limits. Sheriffs were to be chosen from among local knights rather than outsiders and paid so they would not need to take bribes. New castellans were to be appointed and given custody of royal castles.

The king's council was also to be reformed to more effectively advise and control the king. The Twenty-four selected fifteen counsellors (nine representing the barons) who were to advise the king on all matters. The Fifteen were:

 Simon de Montfort, 6th Earl of Leicester
 Richard de Clare, 6th Earl of Gloucester
 Roger Bigod, 4th Earl of Norfolk
 John du Plessis, 7th Earl of Warwick
 Humphrey de Bohun, 2nd Earl of Hereford
 William de Forz, 4th Earl of Albemarle
 Peter of Savoy
 John fitzGeoffrey
 Peter de Montfort
 Richard Grey
 Roger Mortimer
 James Audley
 Boniface of Savoy, Archbishop of Canterbury
 Waltere Cantilupe, Bishop of Worcester
 John Mansel

While the Fifteen controlled the king's council, they were not the only members. The justiciar, treasurer and chancellor were always members, as were other ministers and judges. In addition, the king could still include other advisers. In fact, it was impossible for the Fifteen to constantly be on hand to advise the king. At routine council meetings, the Fifteen were represented by two or three of their number who would decide if any business was important enough to summon the full Fifteen. In addition, the chancellor was made to swear that he would not seal any important grant without the assent of a majority of the Fifteen.

Parliament was also reformed. It was decided that "there be three parliaments a year ... to treat of the common wants of the kingdom, and of the king". Attending three regular parliaments each year would have been a burden for the barons. Therefore, the Twenty-four asked the parliament assembled at Oxford to choose twelve representatives who would attend the regular parliaments. This provision was not meant to limit attendance at parliament to only the twelve; rather, it guaranteed that there would be a minimum representative attendance. Recommendations for an inquest into local (mis-)government and further measures of reform were also set out.

Analysis 
The 1258 Provisions had a significant effect upon the development of the English common law, limiting in part the expansion of royal jurisdiction by way of the number of available writs, but in the main confirming the importance of the common law of the land for all, from king to commoner.

There were weaknesses to this constitutional framework. Most significantly was the lack of any method to prevent future misconduct by the king or those following his orders. Historian G. O. Sayles notes,

Neither the new role of the king nor the powers of the Fifteen was ever defined. Legal scholar Ann Lyon reflected that the provisions "have the feel, as with many of the first fumblings towards constitutional change which occur in the medieval period, and indeed much later, of being incompletely thought through."

Aftermath

A written confirmation of the agreement was sent to the sheriffs of all the counties of England in three languages: Latin, French and, significantly, Middle English. The use of the English language was symbolic of the anglicisation of the government of England and an antidote to the Francization which had taken place in the decades immediately before. The Provisions were the first government documents to be published in English since the Norman Conquest two hundred years before.

The Provisions of Oxford were confirmed and extended in 1259 by the Provisions of Westminster. The reforms implemented by the Fifteen were not limited to changes in government. They also included control of the royal household. The barons determined not only the household's senior members, such as the stewards, but also the lower servants, such as cooks. A humiliated Henry was essentially treated as if he were a minor.

The Provisions of Oxford were overthrown by Henry, helped by a papal bull, in 1261, seeding the start of the Second Barons' War (1263–1267). The king was defeated at the Battle of Lewes in 1264, and Simon de Montfort became the real ruler of England for the next twelve months. However, Henry was still king, and the rebels never considered removing him. Instead, Montfort called a Parliament to sanction a new form of government to control the king. The Parliament held in June 1264 approved the appointment of three electors (Montfort, Stephen Bersted, Bishop of Chichester, and Gilbert de Clare, 7th Earl of Gloucester). These men were to choose a council of nine, by whose advice the king was to rule. The electors could replace any of the nine as they saw fit, but the electors themselves could only be removed by Parliament.

Ultimately, the war was won by the king and his royalist supporters, and the Provisions of Oxford were annulled for the last time in 1266 by the Dictum of Kenilworth. Nonetheless, the administrative and legislative reforms the barons had initiated were taken up and confirmed in the Statute of Marlborough.

See also
 Quia Emptores
 Cestui que
 Henry de Bracton

References

Bibliography

External links

 The Provisions of Oxford (1258) and Westminster (1259) | England Calling
 Rothwell, H. 'English Historical Documents, 1189–1327' pages 356–61. Available on  Google Books.

1250s in law
1258 in England
13th-century documents
Barons' Wars
Constitutional laws of England
Political charters
Medieval English law
Political history of medieval England
Henry III of England